Dmitri Gogolev (born November 25, 1972 in Murmansk, USSR) is a former Russian professional ice hockey forward who last played for Krylya Sovetov team in Russia.

Two of Gogolev's sons are hockey professionals. His eldest son Alexander played in Russia and in the Western Hockey League, while Pavel played in the American Hockey League as of 2023.

Honours
Italian championship:  1999 (With HC Merano)

Career statistics

References

External links

1972 births
Ak Bars Kazan players
HC CSKA Moscow players
HC Merano players
Metallurg Magnitogorsk players
Metallurg Novokuznetsk players
Severstal Cherepovets players
HC Spartak Moscow players
HC Vítkovice players
EC KAC players
Krylya Sovetov Moscow players
Living people
Russian ice hockey right wingers
Soviet ice hockey right wingers
Soviet Wings players
HC Vityaz players
People from Murmansk
Sportspeople from Murmansk Oblast
Russian expatriate sportspeople in the Czech Republic
Russian expatriate sportspeople in Austria
Russian expatriate sportspeople in Italy
Expatriate ice hockey players in the  Czech Republic
Expatriate ice hockey players in Italy
Expatriate ice hockey players in Austria
Russian expatriate ice hockey people